Héctor Valer Pinto (born 4 February 1959) is a Peruvian politician who served as Prime Minister of Peru from 1 February 2022 to 8 February 2022.  

Originally elected to the Peruvian Congress as a invited candidate of the Popular Renewal party, Valer was subsequently expelled from the elected caucus for supporting Pedro Castillo in the aftermath of the second round of the 2021 Peruvian general election. After a brief stint in the We Are Peru – Purple Party caucus, Valer currently sits with the Democratic Peru caucus, composed primarily of former Free Peru lawmakers. 

Valer was appointed as Prime Minister by President Pedro Castillo on 1 February 2022, following the resignation of Mirtha Vásquez. Following his designation as Prime Minister of Peru by President Pedro Castillo, it was revealed that his daughter had denounced him for physical abuse in 2016. On 5 February 2022, Valer announced that he would resign from his position and denied the accusations, saying that the right-wing elements of Peru were responsible for the reports.

When discussing in Congress about those killed in the Juliaca massacre during the 2022–2023 Peruvian protests, Valer issued a terruqueo attack by placing an image of a hammer and sickle near the images of the victims, stating that the dead held "the attitude of those who use the masses and who militate in the Shining Path, who continue to have a communist ideology".

Political positions 
Valer initially began his political career within a far-right party, and he holds ultra-conservative positions according to The Guardian. He was in opposition of sex education and has been observed using sexist language.

References

Prime Ministers of Peru
1959 births
Living people